Goenda Shabor is a Bengali fictional detective series of police officer Shabor Dasgupta, created by novelist Shirshendu Mukhopadhyay.

This is a series of Indian crime thriller films directed by Arindam Sil starring Saswata Chatterjee in the title character. The first film Ebar Shabor was released in 2015, and the second film Eagoler Chokh released in 2016. A third film titled Aschhe Abar Shabor was released in 2018.

Stories
 Rwin
 Prajapatir Mrityu O Punarjanmo
 Aloy Chhayay
 Rup
 Podokkhep
 Marich
 Eagoler Chokh
 Shiri Bhenge Bhenge
 Tirandaj
 Amake Biye Korben?

Films

Ebar Shabor (2015)

This film is based on 'Rwin' by Shirshendu Mukhopadhyay.A police detective Shabor Dasgupta (Saswata Chatterjee) is entrusted with the daunting task of solving the mystery surrounding the murder of Mitali Ghosh (Swastika Mukherjee), a woman with a messy past, who was killed on the night she had thrown a party for friends and family. The task is daunting for Shabor because of the number of people involved. Mitali was once married to Mithu Mitra (Abir Chatterjee), whom she divorced before settling overseas. Though she soon realised how much she loved him, her ego kept her from coming back to him. Heartbroken, Mithu found love in Mitali's cousin Joyeeta (Payel Sarkar). Also involved was Mitali's childhood friend and secret admirer Samiran (Rahul Banerjee), who has relationships with several women, including a school's physical education teacher, Julekha Sharma (June Malia), and another girl, Khonika (Debolina Dutta). Shabor starts investigation with his assistant Nandalal. As Shabor probes deeper, he learns many disturbing secrets about the Ghosh family, including the fact that Mitali had once eloped with a boy from her locality Pantu Haldar (Ritwick Chakraborty). She had married and left him within six months, ruining his future in the process. Another character, Doel, also comes into the picture. The detective now has to deal with the complex relationship problems that run deep root in the family and the mystery gets more and more complicated. The film released on 2 January 2015.

Eagoler Chokh (2016)

This film is based on the story of same name written by Shirshendu Mukhopadhyay. ACP Shabor Dasgupta (Saswata Chatterjee) and his assistant Nanda go on a hunt, searching for a young woman murderer. Trapped in a maze of lies and deceit, Dasgupta suspects the rich entrepreneur Bishan Roy (Anirban Bhattacharya) and three women connected to him. Each of them knew the murdered woman Nandini very well. As Dasgupta delves deep into the mystery, he ends up getting new insight into human psychology and in turn, solving complexities of his own mind. The film was released on 12 August 2016.

Aschhe Abar Shabor (2018)

After success of Eagoler Chokh, a sequel had been confirmed by director Arindam Sil. The film is based on the novel Prajapatir Mrityu O Punorjanmo by Shirshendu Mukhopadhyay. After completing its first schedule in West Bengal, the team flew to Lucknow to shoot rest of the part. Saswata Chatterjee, Subhrajit Dutta and Gourav Chakrabarty returned for the sequel as their respective characters with Indraneil Sengupta, Anindya Chatterjee, Anjana Basu and Mir Afsar Ali with major characters. The film was released on 19 January 2018.

Tirandaj Shabor (2022) 

On 27 May 2022, the fourth film of Shabor series Tirandaj Shabor was released under the direction of Sil. The movie is based on a novel 'Tirandaj' by Shirshendu Mukhopadhyay. Saswata Chatterjee, Subhrajit Dutta, Nigel Akkara, Arindam Sil and Chandan Sen played the lead role in the film.

Cast and Characters

Crew

Awards and nominations

Eagoler Chokh (2016)

References

External links
 
 

Bengali-language Indian films
Indian film series
Crime film series
Thriller film series
Action film series